Between Friends is the fourth studio album by Canadian R&B singer Tamia. Her first project under her own independent label, Plus One Music Group, founded after her departure from Elektra Records in 2004, it was first released in South Africa on May 12, 2006, followed by a worldwide release in the fourth quarter of 2006. A departure from her third studio album More (2004). which included a diverse roster of collaborators, Tamia reteamed with frequent contributor Shep Crawford to work on most of the album, with its title referring to their working relationship and connection during the recording process.

The album received a mixed reviews from critics, many of whom praised Tamia's vocal talents and the range of tracks but found the material too generic and uneven. Upon its US release, Between Friends debuted and peaked at number 66 on the Billboard Hot 200 and number nine on Billboards Top R&B/Hip-Hop Albums, selling 18,000 copies in its first week. While it became her third consecutive top ten album on the latter chart, it also marked Tamia's lowest-charting debut since her first album eight years prior as well as her lowest first week sales by then.

Between Friends produced three singles, including lead single "Can't Get Enough" and follow-up "Me", both of which became Tamia's highest-charting songs in five years, reaching the top thirty of Billboards Hot R&B/Hip-Hop Songs. A third single, "Almost", entered the top forty of the Dance Club Songs chart. In 2007, the album was reissued as a 2-disc album, comprising the original track listing as well as all three Christmas standards from her Christmas EP A Gift Between Friends, released on October 27, 2007.

Background
In 2004, following several delays, Elektra Records released Tamia's third studio album, More. Her highest-charting release yet, it debuted at number seventeen on the US Billboard 200, selling 58,000 copies in its first week – the highest-selling week of her career up to that point. In addition, the album spawned three singles, including lead single "Officially Missing You" which scored moderate success however, reaching the top 40 on Billboards Hot R&B/Hip-Hop Songs. Only a month before Mores official release, Sylvia Rhone, the chairman of Elektra Records, was fired after Warner Music, Elektra's parent company, announced to cut 1,000 jobs among a round of executive exits and departmental restructuring. Rhone, who had been instrumental in Tamia's transition from Qwest to Elektra in the late-1990s, had served as the executive producer on More and previous album A Nu Day (2000) and worked closely with the singer. While Tamia denied rumors that she was seeking to leave the label, she recognized that "It's a scary time for me [...] I definitely was very shocked that Sylvia was let go."

The same year, following its sale by Time Warner, Elektra merged with Atlantic Records, another Warner Music Group label, to form the Atlantic Records Group. At about the same time, Tamia's recording deal was up for renewal and though she was in a position to re-sign with the label, the singer chose to leave the company following her transition. In order to gain more creative control over future projects, she decided to go independent and found her own record label, Plus One Music Group. With Tamia envisioning a consistent, "classic R&B" album, concentrating on "melodies and the songs and the emotion" rather than the producers or "big waves and dips", unlike previous projects, she only consulted longtime contributor Shep Crawford to work with her on her fourth studio album. An intimate process, the pair met on a daily basis in an Orlando recording studio to write and produce new songs "from scratch." During their sessions, Rodney "Darkchild" Jerkins called Tamia after he had heard that she was in the studio, and convinced her to record additional material with him in Atlantic City. Alluding to her working relationship with Crawford and the creation process of the album, it was eventually titled Between Friends.

Release and reception

As Tamia was able to arrange deals with international distributors at different times, Between Friends was first released through Gallo Record Company in South Africa on May 12, 2006 – several months before its arrival in the United States, Tamia's main selling market. Elsewhere, the album was released in November and December 2006 via Image Entertainment, Blacksmith Entertainment, and Universal Music Canada. While the original version, released in South Africa, comprised eleven tracks, the international version featured four additional tracks that were produced by Shep Crawford, including "Have to Go Through It", a duet with Eric Benet,  "Sittin' on the Job" and "Become Us" as well as the single "Almost".

Between Friends received generally mixed to positive reviews from music critics. Allmusic wrote that "with production help from Shep Crawford and Rodney Jerkins, Between Friends offers up a range of tracks, including bouncy club numbers, sensual love songs, and mainstream pop and R&B. But while the music sounds great, it is Tamia's instrument that takes center stage throughout," adding that the album "is packed to the gills with displays of the artist's spectacular, elastic vocal talent." In his review for About.com writer Mark Edward Nero remarked that on Between Friends, "Tamia fails to do enough to distinguish herself from the legions of other pretty-faced/moderately talented singers out there". He felt that her "clear, strong voice" lacked "strong emotive abilities, a wide vocal range, distinctive singing style and much of a personality".

Track listing

Personnel 
Performance credits

Tamia Hill – lead vocals, background vocals
Anesha Birchett – background vocals
Shalonda Crawford – background vocals
Kenya Ivey – background vocals
Lisa Ivey – background vocals

Agape Jerry – guitar
Nora Payne – background vocals
Bryan Russell – bass guitar  
Robert Torres – guitar 
Jonathan Webb – bass guitar  

Technical and production

Shep Crawford – executive producer, composer 
Brian Gardner – mastering
Fred Jerkins III – composer 

Rodney Jerkins – audio production, composer 
Mike Sroka – engineer
Gabriel Varde – tracking

Charts

Weekly charts

Year-end charts

Release history

References 

2006 albums
Albums produced by Rodney Jerkins
Tamia albums